Aviapolis railway station is a Helsinki commuter rail station located in the area of Aviapolis in Vantaa, Finland.

It is one of the new stations of the Ring Rail Line (Kehärata), which opened in July 2015. The station is located between the stations of Kivistö and Lentoasema (Helsinki Airport). The area around the station is planned to be turned into a neighbourhood with office buildings. A bus terminal has also been planned to be built next to the station.  

The station is served by Helsinki Commuter Rail I- and P-line trains. Trains to Airport and Helsinki (via Tikkurila) depart from track 1 and trains towards Helsinki (via Huopalahti) depart from track 2.

References

External links 
 

Railway stations in Vantaa
Railway stations opened in 2015
2015 establishments in Finland